Breakdown structure may refer to:

Project management 
In project management, these are often project components visualised in hierarchical form:

Other 
Breakdown structures used to describe geodesic polyhedra

Disambiguation pages